The highland rush warbler (Bradypterus centralis) is a species of Old World warbler in the family Locustellidae. It is found in Burundi, Democratic Republic of the Congo, Kenya,  Rwanda, and Uganda.

References

highland rush warbler
Birds of East Africa
highland rush warbler
Taxa named by Oscar Neumann